South Kitsap School District No. 402 is the second largest public school district in Kitsap County, Washington, United States.  It serves the city of Port Orchard, a portion of the city of Bremerton and the southern area of the county (360 square miles). The district is the largest employer in Port Orchard.

In May 2011, the district had an enrollment of approximately 9,830 students.

Schools

High schools
 South Kitsap High School 
 Discovery Alternative High School

Middle schools
 Cedar Heights
 John Sedgwick
 Marcus Whitman

Elementary schools
 Burley-Glenwood
 East Port Orchard
 Hidden Creek
 Manchester
 Mullenix Ridge
 Orchard Heights
 Sidney Glen
 South Colby
 Sunnyslope
 Olalla Elementary

Alternative programs
 Discovery Alternative High School
 Explorer Academy

Governance

Board of Directors
The district is governed by a board of five directors elected from geographical sub-districts. Each director is elected for a term of four years.   Board meetings are open to the public held on the first and third Wednesday of each month.

Superintendent
The superintendent serves as Secretary to the Board and provides day-to-day leadership and management to the district. South Kitsap School District has selected Bev Cheney, a former SKSD superintendent, to serve as interim for the 2012-13 school year after the previous superintendent, Dave LaRose, accepted a position as superintendent of Culver City (California) Unified School District.

The district hired Michelle Reid, 53, who is currently assistant superintendent of Port Angeles School District to replace Cheney after the 2012-13 school year. 

The district hired Tim Winter, superintendent of Clarkston School District since 2014, as a new superintendent in early 2019.

References

External links

School districts in Washington (state)
Education in Kitsap County, Washington